"I Need You" is the second Christian radio single from Relient K's fifth album, Five Score and Seven Years Ago, and it was released around July 2007.  The song quickly made it onto ChristianRock.Net's weekly Top 30. It also hit No. 1 on Radio and Records Christian Rock chart.  In February 2008, the single was nominated for a dove award in the "Rock Song of the Year" category.

Awards

In 2008, the song was nominated for a Dove Award for Rock Recorded Song of the Year at the 39th GMA Dove Awards.

References

2007 singles
Relient K songs
Songs written by Matt Thiessen
Song recordings produced by Howard Benson
2007 songs
Capitol Records singles
Gotee Records singles